Albert Schippel (1862–1935) was an American architect in the Midwest.

He designed buildings including:
Rice County Jail, (1910), Faribault, Minnesota
Oleander Saloon, (1901), Mankato, Wisconsin
Immanuel Lutheran School, (1903), Mankato, Wisconsin
German Evangelical Ladies Seminary, (1910), Mankato, Wisconsin.  The seminary has since become Bethany Lutheran College.

References

External links
Albert Schippel, '20th Century Midwest Architect'

1862 births
1935 deaths
Architects from Wisconsin